Kizito Maria Kasule (born 1967) is a Ugandan artist and entrepreneur. His work has been shown throughout East Africa, Belgium, Austria, Germany, Australia, and France, as well as in Denmark and Norway. He has been a lecturer at Makerere University since 1992.

Kasule opened the Nagenda International Academy of Art and Design (NIAAD), a school of higher education in art, in 2006.

Early life
Kizito Maria was born on 1967 a rural village in Uganda. He was the youngest among 12 brothers and sisters. His parents owned a small family-run coffee plantation. At the age of 11 his father demanded that his son quit school and work in the family plantation instead. The young Kizito refused to quit his studies and in return was forced by his father to leave his home. The next few months Kizito lived as a street child, knocking on random doors and offering to work in return for food and shelter. Eventually he was picked by a local man and allowed to reside with him. The next couple of years Kizito spent studding in the morning and working in several coffee plantations at the afternoon in order to pay for his tuition and keep.

In 1987 a civil war broke out in the north of Uganda. Two years later, at the age of 16, Kizito was arrested and sent to a military camp. He labored as a grave digger for fellow prisoners who were executed. One day, after finishing digging several graves, he and his cellmates were ordered to stand at the edge of the graves in front of a firing squad. The soldiers then started executing the prisoners one-by-one, sparing only Kizito's life due to the acquaintance between his dad and one of the camp's officers, who allowed Kizito's escape. He then escaped Uganda with a fake ID. He returned three years later and attended Makerere University in Kampala. In 1992 Kizito graduated with a Bachelor of Arts degree in Art.

Career
In 1994 he held his first solo exhibition, which received positive reviews.

In 2003 Kizito completed his PhD in art history from Makerere University and won a scholarship to Burren College of Art in Ireland.

Kizito Maria is also a philanthropist and community activist. His main community project is the art college of NIAAD which educates teens and other young Ugandans. In 2009 NIAAD joined with the Israeli non-profit organization Brit Olam to create the "Muse Uganda" project. The project houses and educates disadvantaged youth from Uganda and enables them to join the NIAAD academy as regular students at a subsidized price.

Kizito Maria Kasule is currently Dean of Fine arts at Maragret Trowell School of Art and design at Makerere university, Kampala, Uganda.

Exhibitions

Selected solo exhibitions 
2014    Kunst Rett Vest, Asker and Galleri Stilart, Gran, Norway

2011    Makerere University Gallery, Kampala, Uganda

2009    Makerere University Gallery, Kampala, Uganda

2008    La Fontaine Gallery, Kampala, Uganda

2006    Sakaraga Gallery, New York, USA

2004    Windhoek College of Art, Windhoek, Namibia

2000    National Museum of Kenya, Nairobi, Kenya

2000    Paris Gallery, New York, US

1998    German Cultural Centre, Kampala, Uganda

1998    Tulifanya Gallery, Kampala, Uganda

Selected group exhibitions 
2014    Dronninglund Kunstcenter, Denmark

2012    Diani Art Gallery, Mombasa, Kenya

2008    Kultur Stationen, Skørping, Denmark

2005    Burren College of Art Gallery, Ballyvaughan, Ireland

1999    University of Namibia, Windhoek, Namibia

1995    Modern ART, Uganda Austria collaboration, Kampala, Uganda

1995    Art
Space Gallery, Johannesburg, South-Africa

1994    Nommo Gallery, Kampala, Uganda

1994    Art Africa Exhibition 7th pan African Congress, Kampala, Uganda

References

3. www.kizitomariakasule.com

Ugandan painters
Living people
1969 births
Academic staff of Makerere University
20th-century painters
21st-century painters